Lieutenant Colonel Robert George Cole (March 19, 1915 – September 18, 1944) was an American soldier who received the Medal of Honor for his actions in the days following the D-Day Normandy invasion of World War II.

Early U.S. Army career 
Robert G. Cole was born at Fort Sam Houston, in San Antonio, Texas, to Colonel Clarence F. Cole, an Army doctor, and Clara H. Cole on March 19, 1915. He graduated from Thomas Jefferson High School in San Antonio in 1933 and joined the United States Army on July 1, 1934. On June 26, 1935, he was honorably discharged to accept an appointment to the United States Military Academy at West Point.

Cole graduated with the class of 1939 and returned home to marry Allie Mae Wilson. He was appointed a second lieutenant to the 15th Infantry at Fort Lewis, Washington in 1939, and remained there until his transfer to the 501st Parachute Infantry Battalion at Fort Benning, Georgia, in 1941. In March 1941, he earned his jump wings. Rapidly advancing through the ranks at Fort Benning as the parachute infantry battalions were expanded to regiments, he was a lieutenant colonel commanding the 3rd Battalion of the 502nd Parachute Infantry Regiment on June 6, 1944, the date of his unit's first combat jump.

D-Day operations 
Lt Col. Cole parachuted into Normandy with his unit as part of the American airborne landings in Normandy. By the evening of June 6, he had gathered 75 men. They captured Exit 3 at Saint-Martin-de-Varreville behind Utah Beach and were at the dune line to welcome men from the U.S. 4th Infantry Division coming ashore. After being in division reserve, Cole's battalion had guarded the right flank of the 101st Airborne Division attempts to take the approaches to Carentan.

On the afternoon of June 10, Cole led 400 men of his battalion single file down a long, exposed causeway, with marshes at either side. A hedgerow behind a large farmhouse on the right was occupied by well dug-in German troops. At the far end of the causeway was the last of four bridges over the Douve River flood plain. Beyond the last bridge was Carentan, which the 101st had been ordered to seize to effect a linkup with the 29th Infantry Division coming off Omaha Beach.

During the advance Cole's battalion was subjected to continuous fire from artillery, machine guns and mortars. Cole's battalion, advancing slowly by crawling or crouching, took numerous casualties. The survivors huddled against the bank on the far side of the causeway. An obstacle known as a Belgian gate blocked nearly the entire roadway over the last bridge, allowing the passage of only one man at a time. Attempts to force this bottleneck were futile, and the battalion took up defensive positions for the night.

During the night, Cole's men were exposed to shelling by German mortars and by a strafing and bombing attack by two aircraft, causing further casualties and knocking Company I out of the fight. However the fire from the farm slackened and the remaining 265 men infiltrated through the obstacle and took up positions for an assault.

With the Germans still resisting any attempt to move beyond the bridges, and after artillery failed to suppress their fire, Cole called for smoke on the dug-in Germans and ordered a bayonet charge, a rarity in World War II. He charged toward the hedgerow, leading only a small portion of his unit at first. The remainder of the battalion, seeing what was happening followed as Cole led the paratroopers into the hedgerows, engaging at close range and with bayonets in hand-to-hand combat. The German survivors retreated, taking more casualties as they withdrew.

The assault, which came to be known as "Cole's Charge", proved costly; 130 of Cole's 265 men became casualties. With his battalion exhausted, Cole called for the 1st Battalion to pass through his lines and continue the attack. However, they were also severely depleted by mortar fire crossing bridge #4, such that they took up positions with 3rd Battalion rather than proceeding. There, on the edge of Carentan, they were subjected to strong counterattacks by the German 6th Parachute Regiment during the morning and afternoon. At the height of the attack, at approximately 1900, Cole's artillery observer managed to break through radio jamming and called down a concentration by the entire Corps artillery that broke up the attacks for good.

At 0200 on June 12 the 506th PIR passed through their line and captured Hill 30 to the south of Carentan. From there, led by Company E, the 2nd battalion of the 506th PIR (Band of Brothers) attacked north into Carentan at daylight as part of a 3-battalion assault. The German 6th Parachute Regiment, virtually out of ammunition, had abandoned the town during the night, leaving only a small rear guard. By 0730 of June 12 Carentan was captured.

Death & Medal of Honor 

LTC Cole was recommended for a Medal of Honor for his actions that day, but did not live to receive it.

On September 18, 1944, during Operation Market Garden, Colonel Cole, commanding the 3rd Battalion of the 502d PIR in Best, Netherlands, got on the radio. A pilot asked him to put some orange identification panels in front of his position. Cole decided to do it himself. For a moment, Cole raised his head, shielding his eyes to see the plane.

Two weeks later, he was awarded the Medal of Honor for his bayonet charge near Carentan on June 11. As his widow and two-year-old son looked on, Cole's mother accepted his posthumous award on the parade ground, where Cole had played as a child, at Fort Sam Houston.

LTC Cole is buried at Netherlands American Cemetery and Memorial, in Margraten, Netherlands.

Medal of Honor citation 
For gallantry and intrepidity at the risk of his own life, above and beyond the call of duty on 11 June 1944, in France. Lt. Col. Cole was personally leading his battalion in forcing the last 4 bridges on the road to Carentan when his entire unit was suddenly pinned to the ground by intense and withering enemy rifle, machinegun, mortar, and artillery fire placed upon them from well-prepared and heavily fortified positions within  of the foremost elements. After the devastating and unceasing enemy fire had for over 1 hour prevented any move and inflicted numerous casualties, Lt. Col. Cole, observing this almost hopeless situation, courageously issued orders to assault the enemy positions with fixed bayonets. With utter disregard for his own safety and completely ignoring the enemy fire, he rose to his feet in front of his battalion and with drawn pistol shouted to his men to follow him in the assault. Catching up a fallen man's rifle and bayonet, he charged on and led the remnants of his battalion across the bullet-swept open ground and into the enemy position. His heroic and valiant action in so inspiring his men resulted in the complete establishment of our bridgehead across the Douve River. The cool fearlessness, personal bravery, and outstanding leadership displayed by Lieutenant Colonel Cole reflect great credit upon himself and are worthy of the highest praise in the military service.

Legacy 
Robert G. Cole High School at Fort Sam Houston is named after Robert G. Cole as well as a housing area, Cole Park, in Fort Campbell, Kentucky.

LTC Cole is one of the true-to-life characters in the 2005 Gearbox Software games Brothers in Arms: Road to Hill 30, Brothers in Arms: Earned in Blood and the 2008 game Brothers in Arms: Hell's Highway.

On September 18, 2009, a monument was unveiled in Best in the Netherlands, near the place of his death. At the ceremony, Cole's son was present as well as members and veterans of the 101st Airborne Division.

See also 

 List of Medal of Honor recipients
 List of Medal of Honor recipients for World War II

References

External links 

 
 
 
Audio file documenting LTC Cole and his unit's drop into France on D-Dayhttps://archive.org/details/NBCCompleteBroadcastDDay/CBD-440606_NBC0415-News.mp3

1915 births
1944 deaths
United States Army personnel killed in World War II
United States Army Medal of Honor recipients
Military personnel from San Antonio
Jefferson High School (San Antonio, Texas) alumni
United States Army officers
United States Military Academy alumni
World War II recipients of the Medal of Honor
Battle of Normandy recipients of the Medal of Honor